Humphrey Marshall (January 13, 1812 – March 28, 1872) was an American lawyer, politician, and military official from Kentucky. During the Antebellum era, he served four terms in the United States House of Representatives, interrupted by a brief stint as ambassador to China. When the American Civil War broke out, he sided with the Confederacy, becoming a brigadier general in the CS Army and then a Confederate Congressman.

Early life and career
Marshall was born in Frankfort, Kentucky, to John Jay (1785–1846) and Anna Birney Marshall. John Jay Marshall was a legislator, law reporter and judge, whose father, also named Humphrey Marshall, was a member of the United States Senate from Kentucky. This elder Humphrey Marshall was a nephew of Chief Justice John Marshall's father, Thomas Marshall. The younger Humphrey Marshall's uncle James G. Birney was a well known abolitionist, and two first cousins, William Birney and David B. Birney, served as major generals in the Union army. Another cousin, James M. Birney, served briefly as Lieutenant Governor of Michigan, and later Minister to the Netherlands.

Marshall graduated from the United States Military Academy at West Point, New York, in 1832, was assigned to the mounted rangers, served in the Black Hawk War, and was breveted as a second lieutenant. However, he resigned from the Army in April 1833 to study law. He was admitted to the bar in 1833 and practiced in Frankfort for two years before moving to Louisville. He became captain in the Kentucky militia in 1836, major in 1838, and lieutenant colonel in 1841. In 1836 he raised a company of volunteers and marched to defend the Texas frontier against the Indians, but his force disbanded on hearing of General Sam Houston's victory at San Jacinto. In 1846 he became Colonel of the 1st Kentucky Cavalry during the Mexican–American War, where he fought at the Battle of Buena Vista as a part of Zachary Taylor's Army of Occupation. Returning from Mexico, Marshall engaged in agricultural pursuits in Henry County, Kentucky.

He was elected from Kentucky's 7th District as a Whig to the Thirty-first and Thirty-second Congresses and served from March 4, 1849, until his resignation on August 4, 1852. During this time, he supported Henry Clay's Compromise of 1850. Marshall was then appointed Minister to China from 1852 to 1854. Returning to Kentucky, he was elected on the American Party ticket to the Thirty-fourth and Thirty-fifth Congresses (1855–59). He was renominated by acclamation, but declined to run for a fifth term. In 1856, he was a member of the national council of the American Party in New York City, where he was instrumental in abolishing all secrecy in the political organization of the party.

Civil War and later career
Marshall's native Kentucky was a border state. Marshall, a moderate in his political views, supported John C. Breckinridge for president in the Election of 1860 and advocated the commonwealth's neutrality. When his efforts failed and Union troops occupied Kentucky, Marshall enlisted in the Confederate army with the rank of brigadier general, and aided the recruitment effort. He was stationed in western Virginia, but saw limited combat. In January 1862, he lost a battle at Middle Creek in eastern Kentucky to future President James A. Garfield. Garfield's Federal cavalry had chased off Marshall's cavalrymen at Jenny's Creek near Paintsville, Kentucky. Marshall withdrew to the forks of Middle Creek, two miles from Prestonsburg, on the road to Virginia. Garfield attacked on January 9, precipitating the Battle of Middle Creek. He eventually forced Marshall to withdraw after a day's fighting.

Frustrated by his inability to secure a good assignment following his victory at Princeton Court House in present-day West Virginia in May, Marshall briefly resigned his commission in June 1862. However, he soon returned to the army and  participated in Braxton Bragg's Kentucky operations in the fall of 1862. Resigning again from the army in June 1863, he moved to Richmond, Virginia, and continued the practice of law. In November, he was elected to the Second Confederate Congress as a representative from Kentucky's 8th District. With the collapse of the Confederacy, he briefly fled to Texas.

After the war, Marshall moved to New Orleans. His citizenship was restored by President Andrew Johnson in December 1867. He later returned to Louisville and resumed his law practice. He died in Louisville and was buried in the State Cemetery in his native Frankfort.

Author daughter
Humphrey Marshall's daughter, Nelly Nichol Marshall (born in Louisville, Kentucky, 8 May 1845; died in Washington, D.C., 19 April 1898), was an author. In addition to numerous poems and many magazine articles, she published novels entitled: Eleanor Morton, or Life in Dixie (New York, 1865), Sodom Apples (1866), Fireside Gleanings (Chicago, 1866), As by Fire (New York, 1869), Wearing the Cross (Cincinnati, 1868), Passion, or Bartered and Sold (Louisville, 1876), and A Criminal through Love (1882). She married Col. John J. McAfee, of the Confederate army, in 1871.

See also

 Kentucky in the American Civil War
 List of American Civil War generals (Confederate)

Notes

References
 
 
 Eicher, John H., and David J. Eicher, Civil War High Commands. Stanford: Stanford University Press, 2001. .
 Sifakis, Stewart. Who Was Who in the Civil War. New York: Facts On File, 1988. .
 Warner, Ezra J. Generals in Gray: Lives of the Confederate Commanders. Baton Rouge: Louisiana State University Press, 1959. .

External links
 "Confederate Brigadier General Humphrey Marshall" — Article by Civil War historian/author Bryan S. Bush

1812 births
1872 deaths
Burials at Frankfort Cemetery
Politicians from Frankfort, Kentucky
American lawyers
Confederate States Army brigadier generals
Members of the Confederate House of Representatives from Kentucky
United States Military Academy alumni
Kentucky Democrats
Kentucky Know Nothings
19th-century American diplomats
Whig Party members of the United States House of Representatives from Kentucky
Know-Nothing members of the United States House of Representatives from Kentucky
People from Henry County, Kentucky
Politicians from Louisville, Kentucky
19th-century American politicians
Ambassadors of the United States to China